Catherine Leterrier (born 26 October 1942) is a French costume designer.

Leterrier is the wife of François Leterrier, mother of Louis Leterrier, daughter of André Fabius, she is the sister of Laurent Fabius and François Fabius, and aunt of Thomas Fabius.

Filmography

External links

1942 births
Living people
People from Aix-les-Bains
French costume designers
French people of Jewish descent
Women costume designers